The Last Ai (stylized THE LAST A.I.) is the eighth studio album by Japanese-American singer-songwriter Ai, released on December 1, 2010, by Island Records and Universal Sigma. The album features guest appearances and collaborations from Namie Amuro, Snoop Dogg, Kato Miliyah, AK-69, Judith Hill, Boyz II Men, K'naan and Chaka Khan.

Four singles were released from The Last Ai. The lead single, "Fake" was certified gold by the RIAJ, peaking at number 5 on the Billboard Japan Hot 100 while "Still..." and "Stronger" charted within the top 30 of the Japan Hot 100.

Background 
Ai previously released her 2009 compilation album, Best Ai which became her first album to chart number one on the Oricon Japanese Albums chart. Her 2009 studio album, Viva Ai, also performed well commercially.

In September 2010, the title of the album was revealed and was slated for release in December later that year. With the release of "Stronger" featuring Miliyah as the fourth single and its B-side track featuring American rapper Snoop Dogg, Ai revealed multiple artists from the west coast would be featured on the album. In November 2010, the track listing and album cover was revealed.

Track listing

Personnel 
Credits adapted from album's liner notes.

Musicians 

 Ai Carina Uemura – lead vocals, songwriting
 George Tashiro – songwriting
 Uta – arrangement, production, songwriting, composition
 Namie Amuro – featured artist, vocals
 Cordell Broadus – songwriting
 DJ2High – composition
 Snoop Dogg – featured artist
 Miliyah Kato – featured artist, songwriting, vocals
 T. Kura – production
 AK-69 – featured artist, vocals, songwriting
 Jin – composition
 DJ Watarai – production, composition
 Masa Kohama – guitar
 Judith Hill – featured artist, vocals, songwriting
 Jeff Miyahara – production, songwriting
 Yuichi Hayashida – composition
 Boyz II Men – featured artist
 Nathan Morris – vocals
 Shawn Stockman – vocals
 Wanya Morris – vocals
 Suamana "Swoop" Brown – production, songwriting, instruments
 C. Mortimer – songwriting
 Alia Coley – songwriting, background vocals
 Erik Hammer – guitar
 Tim Lou – cello
 Geott Osika – bass
 Lisa Liu – violin
 Mark Robertson – violin
 Chaka Khan – featured artist, vocals
 Jeremey Soule – composition
 Andrew Bloch – songwriting
 Bruno Mars – songwriting
 Edmond Dunne – songwriting
 Jean Duval – songwriting 
 Keinan Abdi Warsame – songwriting
 Phillip Lawrence – songwriting
 The Smeezingtons – production
 David Foster – songwriting
 Tom Keane – songwriting
 Cynthia Weil – songwriting

Technical 

 Ai Carina Uemura – executive production
 Ryosuke Kataoka – vocal engineering
 D.O.I – mixing
 DJ2High – coordination
 Okuda Supa – vocal engineering
 Travis "Shaggy" Marshal – vocal engineering
 Yasuaki Sakuma – vocal engineering
 Neeraj Khajanchi – vocal engineering
 Hiroaki Okuda – recording engineering
 Hiroki Soshi – recording engineering assistant
 Satoshi Hosoi – mixing
 Suamana "Swoop" Brown – vocal arrangement
 Masashi Kubo – mixing
 Masato Kamata – vocal editing
 Phil Tan – mixing
 Dave McNair – mastering
 Tremaine "Six 7" Williams – vocal engineering
 Tiger – vocal direction

Visuals and imagery 

 Toshiya Ohno – art direction
 Kenjiro Harigai –  designer
 Kyosuke Ochiai – coordination
 Yasunari Kikuma – photography
 Noriko Goto – styling
 Akemi Ono – hair, makeup
 Akilla – tattoo designer
 Hitomi Miyamoto – artwork coordination

Chart performance 
The Last Ai debuted and peaked at number 14 on the Japanese Oricon Albums chart, charting for eight weeks.

Release history

References 

Ai (singer) albums
2010 albums
Japanese-language albums
Universal Music Group albums
Island Records albums
Albums produced by the Smeezingtons
Universal Sigma albums